John Paul Carr is an American politician serving in the Arkansas House of Representatives.

Arkansas House of Representatives
Carr faced Adrienne Woods in the 2020 Arkansas House 94th District Republican Primary. Carr won the primary against AWoods, 1,019 votes to 938. Carr defeated Jene Huffman-Gilreath in the general election, 5,654 votes to 4,681.

93rd Arkansas General Assembly
Carr began serving as a Representative on January 11, 2021.
During the 93rd Assembly, Carr served on the following committees:
 House City, County and Local Affairs Committee
 Public Transportation Committee
 Advanced Communications and Information Technology Committee

Personal life
Carr resides in Rogers, Arkansas. Carr is a Christian.

References

Living people
Republican Party members of the Arkansas House of Representatives
21st-century American politicians
People from Benton County, Arkansas
Year of birth missing (living people)
University of Missouri alumni